Yeo Gek Huat (born 1931) is a Singaporean basketball player. He competed in the men's tournament at the 1956 Summer Olympics. Yeo was listed on a list of former Olympians which were uncontactable as of 2011.

References

External links
 

1931 births
Possibly living people
Singaporean men's basketball players
Olympic basketball players of Singapore
Basketball players at the 1956 Summer Olympics
Singaporean sportspeople of Chinese descent
Place of birth missing (living people)